is a Japanese manga series written and illustrated by Akane Tamura. It was serialized in Shogakukan's seinen manga magazine Monthly Big Comic Spirits from April 2014 to June 2015.

Publication
Written and illustrated by Akane Tamura, Tasogare Memorandum was serialized in Shogakukan's seinen manga magazine Monthly Big Comic Spirits from April 26, 2014, to June 27, 2015. Shogakukan collected its chapters in two tankōbon volumes, released on March 12 and September 11, 2015.

Volume list

References

Further reading

Seinen manga
Shogakukan manga